During the construction of the dam the two villages of Asahi and Kushihara were flooded. 177 villagers were displaced.

See also
Yahagi No.2 Dam

Dams in Aichi Prefecture
Dams completed in 1970